Natálie Mlýnková (born 24 May 2001) is a Czech ice hockey player and member of the Czech national team, currently playing with the Vermont Catamounts women's ice hockey program in the Hockey East (WHEA) conference of the NCAA Division I.

She represented the Czech Republic at the IIHF Women's World Championships in 2019 and 2021. With the Czech national under-18 team, she played in the IIHF Women's U18 World Championships in 2017, 2018, and 2019, and won a silver medal with the Czech national under-16 team in the girls' ice hockey tournament at the 2016 Winter Youth Olympics.

References

External links
 
 

2001 births
Living people
Czech expatriate ice hockey players in Canada
Czech expatriate ice hockey players in the United States
Czech women's ice hockey forwards
Ice hockey players at the 2016 Winter Youth Olympics
Ice hockey players at the 2022 Winter Olympics
Olympic ice hockey players of the Czech Republic
Sportspeople from Zlín
Vermont Catamounts women's ice hockey players